Bobrowniki Wielkie  is a village in the administrative district of Gmina Żabno, within Tarnów County, Lesser Poland Voivodeship, in southern Poland.

The village has a population of 740.

References

Bobrowniki Wielkie